Col du Granier (el. 1,134 m.) is a mountain pass in the Alps in the department of Savoie in France which crosses the Chartreuse Mountains to connect the villages of Entremont-le-Vieux (south), Apremont (north) and Chapareillan (east). It has been traversed several times by the Tour de France cycle race, including on Stage 12 of the 2012 race. It is situated between Mont Granier (1,933 m) (south-east) and Mont Joigny (1,558 m) (north-west).

Cycle racing

Details of the climbs
From the north, the climb starts at Chambéry, from where there are 15.3 km.of climbing, gaining  864 m. in height at an average of 5.6%.

From Chapareillan (east), the climb (via the D285) is 9.7 km. long, gaining 845 m. at an average of 8.6%, with a maximum of 17.9%.

From St-Pierre-d'Entremont (south),  the climb is 9.4 km. at an average of 5.3%, gaining 494m. in height.

Appearances in Tour de France
The pass was first included in the Tour de France in 1947  and has since featured 17 times and is generally ranked as a Category 1 or 2 climb. It was crossed most recently on Stage 12 of the 2012 tour, between Saint-Jean-de-Maurienne and Annonay-Davézieux, approaching from the direction of Chapareillan.

References

External links
 
 Website
Col du Granier on Google Maps (Tour de France classic climbs)

Mountain passes of Auvergne-Rhône-Alpes
Mountain passes of the Alps